Naas or NAAS may refer to:

People
 Naas Botha (b. 1958), South African rugby player 
 Roberta Naas, American writer about timepieces
 Stefan Naas (born 1973), German politician

Places
 Naas, a town in eastern Ireland
 Naas, Austria, a municipality in Styria, Austria
 Naas (valley), a valley in south-eastern Australia
 Nääs Castle, near Gothenburg, Sweden, a 17th-century mansion 
 Naas River, river in Australia's Murray–Darling basin

Other
 National Assembly Party, a political party in Saudi Arabia
 Naval Auxiliary Air Station of the United States Navy
 Network as a service (NaaS), a business model for telecommunications operators